The Baby Doll Night (translit. Leilet El-Baby Doll) is an Egyptian political comedy-drama film released in June 2008.

Plot
As the film progresses, Awadein realizes that Srg. Peter was the prison warden at Abu Ghraib and that he is also staying at the hotel that he intends to bomb. Events reach their climax when Shoukry betrays Awadein upon realizing that the bombing of the hotel is a futile act that will only result in the murder of innocent people.

Cast and crew

Main cast

Main cast of the film, as listed on its website.

Cameos

 Amr Adib
 Ola Ghanem
 Osama Mounir
 Mahmoud El-Guindy
 Ruby
 Mona Hala

References

External links
 
 

2008 films
Egyptian comedy-drama films
Films set in Cairo
Films shot in Turkey
Films set in Turkey
Films about terrorism in Asia